Syncordulia venator is a species of dragonfly in the family Corduliidae. This was first described by Barnard in 1933.  Syncordulia venator belongs to the genus Syncordulia, and family Corduliidae. The IUCN classifies the species as vulnerable.

References 

Odonata of Africa
Insects of South Africa
Corduliidae